Pedicia is a genus of hairy-eyed craneflies (family Pediciidae).

Selected species
Subgenus Amalopis Haliday, 1856
P. depressiloba Alexander, 1945
P. fimbriatula Alexander, 1953
P. norikurae Alexander, 1958
P. occulta (Meigen, 1830)
P. pallida Savchenko, 1976
P. seticauda (Alexander, 1924)
P. setipennis (Alexander, 1931)
P. tenuiloba Alexander, 1957
P. vetusta (Alexander, 1913)
Subgenus Crunobia Kolenati, 1859
P. apusenica Ujvarosi & Stary, 2003
P. dispar Savchenko, 1978
P. littoralis (Meigen, 1804)
P. lobifera Savchenko, 1986
P. nielseni (Slipka, 1955)
P. pallens Savchenko, 1978
P. patens Alexander, 1938
P. persica Alexander, 1975
P. riedeli (Lackschewitz, 1940)
P. semireducta Savchenko, 1978
P. spinifera Stary, 1974
P. staryi Savchenko, 1978
P. straminea (Meigen, 1838)
P. tjederi Mendl, 1974
P. zangheriana Nielsen, 1950
P. zernyi (Lackschewitz, 1940)
Subgenus Pedicia Latreille, 1809
P. albivitta Walker, 1848
P. arctica Frey, 1921
P. baikalica (Alexander, 1930)
P. bellamyana Alexander, 1964
P. brachycera Alexander, 1933
P. cockerelli Alexander, 1925
P. contermina Walker, 1848
P. cubitalis Alexander, 1933
P. daimio (Matsumura, 1916)
P. falcifera Alexander, 1941
P. gaudens (Alexander, 1925)
P. gifuensis Kariya, 1934
P. goldsworthyi Petersen, 2006
P. grandior (Alexander, 1923)
P. issikiella Alexander, 1953
P. kuwayamai Alexander, 1966
P. laetabilis Alexander, 1938
P. lewisiana Alexander, 1958
P. magnifica (Hine, 1903)
P. margarita Alexander, 1930
P. nawai Kariya, 1934
P. obtusa Osten Sacken, 1877
P. parvicellula Alexander, 1938
P. procteriana Alexander, 1939
P. rivosa (Linnaeus, 1758)
P. simulata Alexander, 1938
P. subfalcata Alexander, 1941
P. subobtusa Alexander, 1949
P. subtransversa Alexander, 1933

See also
 List of Pedicia species

References

 

Pediciidae
Tipuloidea genera
Taxa named by Pierre André Latreille